Andréossy is a surname. Notable people with the surname include:

 Antoine-François Andréossy (1761–1828), Franco-Italian nobleman and diplomat
 François Andréossy (1633–1688), French engineer and cartographer